Jason Walker may refer to:

Jason Walker (footballer) (born 1984), English footballer
Jason Walker (musician) (born 1969), Australian musician

See also 
 Jay Walker (disambiguation)